Zythos avellanea is a moth of the  family Geometridae. It is found from the north-eastern part of the Himalaya to Taiwan, Sumatra and Borneo.

References

Moths described in 1932
Scopulini